Kaptai National Park is a major national park of Bangladesh situated in Rangamati District. It was established in 1999 and its area is 5,464.78 hectares(13,498.0 Acres). Prior to declaration of the national park, it was Sitapahar Reserve. The original Sitapahar Reserve area was 14,448.0 acres. Out of this an area of 100 acres have been dereserved for the establishment of the industrial estate at Kaptai. It is about 57 kilometre from Chittagong city. It comprises with two Ranges namely Kaptai Range and Karnaphuli Range. Kaptai National park is being managed under CHT South Forest Division. It is historically important because of first time teak (Tectona grandis) plantation in Bangladesh was started from this area. Its forest type is mixed evergreen forest. In 2009 IPAC(Integrated Protected Area Co-management) project started its activities in this protected area.

Socio-economic context 

The NP is situated inside the Kaptai City and since the natural scenery is very attractive and it receives many visitors year round. Nearly 60 local people are employed as service providers to the tourists and the services range from transport, vendors, restaurants and gift shop. The NP has high community development opportunities through eco-tourism if properly planned. The Park also provides subsistence to local people through NTFPs. Surrounding population of the National Park area is about 3000. Also it is near the largest lake of Bangladesh which is Kaptai lake, another tourist destination.

Wildlife diversity 

Kaptai National Park is unique for its historic monumental Teak plantations of 1873, 1878 and 1879, the starting points of modern Forest Management in this sub-continent. These plantations have taken the look of natural forests and supports wildlife.

Notable animals are Asian elephant (Elephas maximus), western hoolock gibbon (Hylobates hoolock), Phayre's leaf monkey (Trachypithecus phayrei), capped leaf monkey (Trachypithecus pileatus), dholes (Cuon alpinus), wild boar (Sus scrofa), sambar (Cervus unicolor), barking deer (Muntiacus muntjak), clouded leopard (Neofelis nebulosa), rock python (Python molurus), etc. Among these, elephants, clouded leopards and dholes are critically endangered species of Bangladesh. Although elephants and gibbons are fairly common, dholes and sambars are very rare.

It is a harbour of many wild birds. Notable birds are red junglefowl (Gallus gallus), kalij pheasant (Lophura leucomelanos), lineated barbet (Magalaima lineata), oriental pied hornbill (Anthracoceros albirostris), Indian roller (Coracias benghalensis), cattle egret (Bubulcus ibis), great egret (Casmerodius albus), greater racket-tailed drongo (Dicrurus paradiseus), jungle myna (Acridotheres fuscus), large blue flycatcher (Cyornis magnirostris) etc.

A camera trap project in 2014 captured first ever live photo of clouded leopard in wild in Bangladesh. Also large blue flycatcher, a new bird species of the country was discovered

Flora diversity 

There are many important plants available in the Kaptai National Park such as kali garjan (Dipterocarpus turbinatus), gutgutia (Fortium serratum), bohera (Terminalia belerica), pitali (Trewia nudiflora), pitraj (Aphanamixis polystachya), jarul (Lagerstroemia speciosa), chatim (Alstonia scholaris), ashok (Saraca indica), mehogoni (Swietenia mahagoni), toon (Toona ciliata), dharmara (Stereospermum personatum), udal (Sterculia villosa), civit (Swintonia floribunda), bandorhola (Duabanga grandiflora), barmala (Callicarpa arbores), amloki (Phyllanthus embelica), horitoki (Terminalia chebula), dhakijam (Syzygium grande), teak (Tectona grandis), sonalu (Cassia fistula), champaphul (Michelia champaca), bonsimul (Salmalia insignis) etc. It is especially famous for its Burmese teak plantations.

Threat assessment 

The main threats to this NP are illicit felling of commercially important teak, intensive collection of fuel wood and over grazing of livestock. Fuel wood collection takes many forms, from collection of dead 
wood to harvesting of branches and whole stem which if not sustainably done may damage the ecological balance of this NP. Continuous droughts and civil strife have resulted in a large increase in the number of 
people along the boundaries of the park in the last three decades. Most of these people own livestock and engage in subsistence agriculture. The presence of large numbers of livestock has increased pressure on 
the national park.

Gallery

See also

Bhawal National Park
Satchari National Park
List of protected areas of Bangladesh
Madhupur tract
Sangu Wildlife Sanctuary
Sundarbans

References 

National parks of Bangladesh
Tourist attractions in Chittagong Division
Rangamati Hill District
Forests of Bangladesh
Karnaphuli River
Protected areas established in 1999
1999 establishments in Bangladesh